Chilodontidae is the taxonomic name given to two families : 

 Chilodontaidae (formerly Chilodontidae), a family of gastropods from the order Neritoidea
 Chilodontidae (fish), a small family of ray-finned fishes from the order Characiformes